St. Ladislaus Church may refer to:

in Europe
 St. Ladislaus Church in Veľká Paka, Slovakia
 St. Ladislaus Church  in the Kőbánya district of Budapest, Hungary
 St. Ladislaus Church in Nocrich, Romania

in the United States
(Alphabetically, by state:)
 St. Ladislaus Church (South Norwalk, Connecticut)
 St. Ladislaus in Chicago, a Roman Catholic church in Chicago, Illinois
 St. Ladislaus Church in New Brunswick, New Jersey
St. Ladislaus Roman Catholic Church (Hempstead, New York - Long Island)
St. Ladislaus Roman Catholic Church (Lorain, Ohio), listed on the National Register of Historic Places in Lorain County, Ohio

See also 
 Ladislaus I of Hungary